Michael DiMassa (born September 17, 1990) is an American politician who served in the Connecticut House of Representatives from the 116th district from 2017 to 2021.

On October 20, 2021, he was arrested and charged with stealing $600,000 in COVID relief funds. He resigned from the Connecticut House of Representatives on October 25, 2021.

References

1990 births
Living people
21st-century American politicians
Democratic Party members of the Connecticut House of Representatives
Connecticut politicians convicted of crimes